Alienated may refer to:
 Alienated (TV series), a 2003 Canadian science fiction TV series 
 "Alienated" (Diagnosis Murder episode), an episode of the sixth season of Diagnosis Murder
 "Alienated" (Eureka episode), an episode of the first season of Eureka
 "Alienated", a song by Keri Hilson on her album In a Perfect World...
 Alienated, the first book in the Alienated trilogy by Melissa Landers

See also
 Alienation (disambiguation)